The Government of Kosovo  exercises executive authority in the Republic of Kosovo. It is composed of government ministers, and is led by the prime minister. The prime minister is elected by the Assembly of the Republic of Kosovo. Ministers are nominated by the prime minister and then confirmed by the assembly. 

Albin Kurti is the current prime minister of Kosovo. His government, approved by the assembly and installed on March 22, 2021, consists of Albanians, as well as ministers from Kosovo's ethnic minorities, which include Bosniaks, Romani, Turks and Serbs. Although the government includes representatives of ethnic minorities, it is dominated by the Albanian majority, who have most influence on the decision-making.

Current cabinet

Former cabinets

See also 
Politics of Kosovo

Notes and references

Notes

References

External links
 

 
Kosovo
Parallel structures in Kosovo
Kosovo